Transforming growth factor-β (TGF-β) principally relays its effects through the Smad pathway however, accumulating evidence indicate that alternative signalling routes are also employed by this pleiotropic cytokine. For instance recently, we [?] have demonstrated that ligand-occupied TGF-β receptors can directly trigger the TRAF6-TAK1 signalling module, resulting in MAP kinase activation. Here we report identification of the adaptor molecule TTRAP as a novel component of this non-canonical TGF-β pathway. We show that the protein associates with TGF-β receptors and components of the TRAF6-TAK1 signaling module, resulting in differential regulation of TGF-β activated p38 and NF-κB responses. Modulation of cellular TTRAP level affects cell viability in the presence of TGF-β, suggesting that the protein is an important component of the TGF-β induced apoptotic process.

Interactions 

TTRAP has been shown to interact with ETS1, TNFRSF1B and CD40.

References

Further reading

Interactions 

TTRAP has been shown to interact with ETS1, TNFRSF1B and CD40.

References

Further reading

Function 

This gene encodes a member of a superfamily of divalent cation-dependent phosphodiesterases. The encoded protein associates with CD40, tumor necrosis factor (TNF) receptor-75 and TNF receptor associated factors (TRAFs), and inhibits nuclear factor-kappa-B activation. This protein has sequence and structural similarities with APE1 endonuclease, which is involved in both DNA repair and the activation of transcription factors.

Interactions 

TTRAP has been shown to interact with ETS1, TNFRSF1B and CD40.

References

Further reading 

 
 
 
 
 
 

Genes on human chromosome 6